USS Chopper (SS/AGSS/IXSS-342), a  submarine, was the only ship of the United States Navy to be named for the chopper, a bluefish common in the rivers of the Mississippi Valley. Her keel was laid down by the Electric Boat Company in Groton, Connecticut. She was launched on 4 February 1945 sponsored by Mrs. G. S. Beebe, and commissioned on 25 May 1945.

Chopper  sailed from New London, Connecticut on 4 July 1945 for Pearl Harbor, where she lay from 21 September-24 October. On 30 October, she arrived at San Diego, California, her assigned home port. She sailed on 2 January 1946 for the Philippines, where she trained and offered local services until 11 May, when she returned to San Diego and began local operations. Her next deployment – a simulated war patrol to China – took place from 28 July-9 November 1947. After west coast operations through 1948, she departed San Diego on 14 March 1949 for her new home port, Key West, Florida, arriving on 4 April. Operations in Florida waters and the Caribbean Sea were conducted until 15 September 1950, when she entered the Electric Boat Company yards for modernization. She returned to Key West for fleet exercises and training 23 May 1951.

Chopper departed Key West, Florida on 7 January 1952 for a tour of duty in the Mediterranean Sea until 20 May. She resumed local operations, then joined in North Atlantic Treaty Organization (NATO) operations in the Atlantic from 12 September-14 October. Frequent trips to Guantanamo Bay, Cuba, and local operations continued until 25 May 1959, when she sailed to join in special exercises in the Mediterranean before returning to Key West on 9 August. Through 1960, she continued operations off Florida and in the Caribbean Sea, often acting as target for surface ships in training.

Accident
On 11 February 1969, Chopper was participating in an ASW exercise off the coast of Cuba with  when her electrical power tripped off-line.

Within seconds, Choppers angle increased to 45° down and her bow passed  of depth. Because of the power loss, the officer of the deck was unable to communicate with the senior controllerman in the maneuvering room, but the senior chief petty officer in the maneuvering room, Ken Taylor, independently ordered both main motors back full. Despite the backing bell, blowing ballast, and other efforts to regain control of the submarine, the down angle continued to increase, and within one minute of the power failure, Chopper was nearly vertical in the water, bow down.

The crew's efforts began to take effect. Chopper lost the headway that was taking her deeper, and even began to make sternway. Her bow began to rise, reached level, and continued to climb.  Chopper began to ascend with a rapidly increasing up-angle until she was again nearly vertical in the water, now bow up.

About two minutes after losing electrical power, Chopper shot through the surface of the ocean, nearly vertical. The entire forward section of the submarine, to the aft edge of the sail, cleared the surface before she fell back. Her momentum carried her down to a depth of about  before she surfaced again, leveled out, and remained on the surface.

Chopper returned to port under her own power. Inspection discovered that her hull had suffered extensive structural damage during the deep dive and rapid ascent. Chopper was decommissioned on 15 September 1969.

Later career and disposal
Chopper was re-classified, given hull classification symbol AGSS-342, and served as a United States Naval Reserve (USNR) dockside trainer in New Orleans, Louisiana until 1971, when the USNR Submarine Reserve program was discontinued. She was re-classified, given hull classification symbol IXSS-342, and was used for salvage and rescue training.

In 1976, Chopper was modified to serve as a tethered, submerged torpedo target for the submarine . On 21 July, while Spadefish was on her final approach, Chopper began to take on water, broke her tethers, and sank.

Fiction
In his book The Hunt for Red October, author Tom Clancy mentions the misfortune of Chopper in 1969 while discussing the fate of the fictional Soviet  fast-attack sub E.S. Politovskiy.

References

External links

USS Chopper Association

Balao-class submarines
World War II submarines of the United States
Cold War submarines of the United States
United States submarine accidents
Shipwrecks of the Carolina coast
Ships built in Groton, Connecticut
1945 ships
Maritime incidents in 1969
Maritime incidents in 1976